Johannes Roelof Maria "Jan" van den Brink (12 April 1915 – 19 July 2006)  was a Dutch politician of the defunct Catholic People's Party (KVP) now merged into the Christian Democratic Appeal (CDA) party and businessman. He was minister of Economic Affairs in three successive governments from 1948 till 1952. At several occasions he turned down an offer to become prime minister.

Decorations

References

External links

Official
  Dr. J.R.M. (Jan) van den Brink Parlement & Politiek
  Dr. J.R.M. van den Brink (KVP) Eerste Kamer der Staten-Generaal

 

1915 births
2006 deaths
Catholic People's Party politicians
Dutch art collectors
Dutch bankers
Dutch business writers
Dutch chief executives in the finance industry
Dutch company founders
Dutch corporate directors
Dutch financial advisors
Dutch financial analysts
Dutch financial writers
Dutch male painters
Dutch newspaper editors
Dutch nonprofit directors
Dutch nonprofit executives
Dutch people of World War II
Dutch political writers
Dutch resistance members
Dutch Roman Catholics
Grand Croix of the Légion d'honneur
Grand Crosses of the Order of the Crown (Belgium)
Grand Officers of the Order of Orange-Nassau
Knights of the Holy Sepulchre
Knights of the Order of the Netherlands Lion
Knights of St. Gregory the Great
Members of the Senate (Netherlands)
Ministers of Economic Affairs of the Netherlands
Monetarists
Monetary economists
People from Laren, North Holland
People from Hilversum
Public economists
Roman Catholic State Party politicians
Tilburg University alumni
Academic staff of Tilburg University
20th-century Dutch businesspeople
20th-century Dutch civil servants
20th-century Dutch economists
20th-century Dutch educators
20th-century Dutch male writers
20th-century Dutch painters
20th-century Dutch politicians